25 let Voenkonezavoda is a rural locality (a settlement) in Budyonnovskoye Rural Settlement of Salsky District, Russia. The population was 109 as of 2010.

Geography 
The settlement is located 26 km north of Salsk (the district's administrative centre) by road. Salsky Beslan is the nearest rural locality.

Streets 
 Teatralnaya
 Urozhainaya

References 

Rural localities in Rostov Oblast